{
  "type": "FeatureCollection",
  "features": [
    {
      "type": "Feature",
      "properties": {},
      "geometry": {
        "type": "Point",
        "coordinates": [
          18.51641,
          73.85614
        ]
      }
    },
    {
      "type": "Feature",
      "properties": {},
      "geometry": {
        "type": "Point",
        "coordinates": [
          72.83607244491579,
          18.93183862934435
        ]
      }
    }
  ]
}

The Asiatic Society of Mumbai Town Hall or Town Hall Mumbai is a Neoclassical building located in the Fort locality of South Mumbai. It houses The Asiatic Society of Mumbai, State Central Library and a museum, the head office of the Directorate of Libraries Maharashtra State, Maharashtra State Women's Council, the Additional Controller of Stamps Office and a post office.

History 
In 1811, the plan for construction began. Initially, the construction of the town hall (colloquially Called "Tondal" in the 19th century) could not be completed because of the lack of funds; only the library and museum were built after raising an amount of Rs.10,000 through a lottery conducted by the 'Literary Society of Bombay' (Mumbai). Construction was eventually completed in 1833.

Architecture
The building was designed by Colonel Thomas Cowper of the Bombay Engineers. The architectural style of the building is Neoclassical architecture that came into existence in the 18th century.

Structure 
The structure has a height of 100 feet and a span of 200 feet. It was inspired by Greek and Roman styles of architecture. There is a flight of 30 steps leading to the entrance of the Town Hall. The entrance of the building is adorned with a Grecian portico and eight Doric styled pillars. The entire construction was made of stones brought from England and was designed in a Neo-classical fashion. Within the building are wooden floors, spiral staircases, and terraces adorned with wrought iron. The hall boasts of a collection of marble statues of Indian patrons of the 19th century. 

There is also a flagpole on the building on which the Indian National Flag is hoisted on the 15th of August and 26th of January, every year.

Significance
The Asiatic Society of Mumbai Town Hall is a classified heritage structure. Sir John Malcolm, Governor of Mumbai in 1930 said, "It is the most magnificent structure that taste and munificence combined have as yet erected in India".

There are many ancient manuscripts in Persian, Prakrit, Urdu and Sanskrit along with other treasures preserved in the hall. Dante's first issue of Inferno is one of the treasures kept at the town hall.

References 

Government buildings in Mumbai
Neoclassical architecture in India
1833 establishments in India
Tourist attractions in Mumbai